= Phadia An Na Mohra =

- Town
- Location within Pakistan
- Coordinates: 33.24°N 73.24°E
- Country: Pakistan
- Province: (Islamabad Capital Territory) Islamabad C.T
- Elevation: 507 m (1,663 ft)
- Time zone: UTC+5 (PST)

Phadia An Na Mohra is a town in the Islamabad Capital Territory of Pakistan. It is located at 33° 24' 40N 73° 24' 10E with an altitude of 507 metres (1666 feet).
